Manorama Madhwaraj is an Indian politician, Social worker and officeholder who was the first woman cabinet minister of India elected as an MLA in the 5th, 8th and 9th Karnataka Legislative Assembly. On all of these occasions she was elected from Udupi constituency and was a member of the Indian National Congress.

She was also member of the 14th Lok Sabha of India. She represented the Udupi constituency of Karnataka and was a member of the Bharatiya Janata Party (BJP) political party. She quit BJP and Lok Sabha after voting in favour of Congress during vote of confidence.

Her son, Pramod Madhwaraj was a minister in Siddaramayya's Congress Government between 2013-18.

Positions held 
 1972 - 1994,	Member of Karnataka Legislative Assembly
 1974 - 83, Cabinet Minister, Government of Karnataka
 1989 - 94, Cabinet Minister, Government of Karnataka
 2001 - 2003, Chairperson (Cabinet Rank) of State Tourism Development Corporation
 2004,	Elected as Member of 14th Lok Sabha
 2004, Member of Committee on Water Resources
 16 August 2006 to present, Member of Committee on Empowerment of Women
 5 August 2007 to present,	Member of Committee on Water Resources

References

External links
 

Living people
India MPs 2004–2009
Mangaloreans
People from Udupi
Lok Sabha members from Karnataka
Bharatiya Janata Party politicians from Karnataka
Indian National Congress politicians from Karnataka
20th-century Indian women politicians
20th-century Indian politicians
21st-century Indian women politicians
21st-century Indian politicians
Mysore MLAs 1972–1977
Members of the Mysore Legislature
Karnataka MLAs 1985–1989
Karnataka MLAs 1989–1994
1940 births
Women members of the Karnataka Legislative Assembly